Ramón Antonio Mifflin Páez (born 5 April 1947) is a former Peruvian football player.

Career 

He started his career in Centro Iqueño in 1963, by 1965 he played in Defensor Arica, and signed with Peruvian team Sporting Cristal in 1968 after being named player of the year. He then started in the 1970 FIFA World Cup for the Peru national football team with Héctor Chumpitaz, Teófilo Cubillas, Roberto Challe, and Hugo Sotil which were eliminated. After his play in the World Cup, he was signed by Racing Club of Argentina, and followed by Santos of Brazil where he became a close friend of Edson Arantes do Nascimento – Pelé. When Pele retired from Brazilian soccer, he signed for the New York Cosmos of the North American Soccer League (NASL).  Pele recommended several players to come and join the NY Cosmos, among them, Carlos Alberto of Brazil and Ramon Mifflin from Peru.  IN 1975, Mifflin signed with the Cosmos and remained with the team until 1977.  In 1978, he played six games with the Los Angeles Aztecs. Later that year he played 18 games with the New York Eagles of the American Soccer League

Mifflin made 44 appearances for the Peru national football team from 1966 to 1973. Mifflin also played for Peru at the 1970 FIFA World Cup finals in Mexico.

Retirement 

Ramon Mifflin would then end up as an assistant coach for the 1982 World Cup Squad. His son Ramon also played pro soccer, and is now a professional soccer coach in Calgary Alberta Canada at Calgary Blizzard Soccer Club.

Honours

 Sporting Cristal
Peruvian League
Winner (5): 1968, 1970, 1972, 1979, 1980
Runner-up (2): 1967, 1973

 New York Cosmos
North American Soccer League
Winner (1): 1977

References

External links
 NASL/ASL stats

1947 births
Living people
Footballers from Lima
Association football midfielders
Peruvian footballers
Peruvian people of British descent
Peru international footballers
1970 FIFA World Cup players
Peruvian Primera División players
Sporting Cristal footballers
Racing Club de Avellaneda footballers
Argentine Primera División players
Santos FC players
North American Soccer League (1968–1984) players
New York Cosmos players
American Soccer League (1933–1983) players
New York Eagles players
Centro Iqueño footballers
Los Angeles Aztecs players
Independiente Santa Fe footballers
Categoría Primera A players
Peruvian expatriate footballers
Expatriate footballers in Argentina
Expatriate footballers in Brazil
Expatriate footballers in Colombia
Expatriate soccer players in the United States
Peruvian expatriate sportspeople in Argentina
Peruvian expatriate sportspeople in Brazil
Peruvian expatriate sportspeople in Colombia
Peruvian expatriate sportspeople in the United States
Juan Aurich managers